Tyler Kelleher (born January 2, 1995) is an American professional ice hockey right wing who currently plays for Lahti Pelicans in the Liiga. He was an All-American for New Hampshire.

Playing career
Kelleher had solid junior career, playing on the USNTDP at the end of his high school days. He was selected for both the under-17 and under-18 squads and won a silver medal at the 2013 championship.

The diminutive Kelleher began attending the University of New Hampshire in the fall of 2013 and had a mediocre freshman season. He saw his numbers nearly triple the following year, leading the team's offense. Unfortunately, UNH began to slide in the standings and finished the year 8th in Hockey East. While he continued to produce as an upperclassman, the Wildcats couldn't stop their slide and finished 10th in each of his final two seasons. While he couldn't help New Hampshire produce winning records, Kelleher was one of the best scorers in college hockey and finished his senior season tied for the NCAA scoring title.

Being undrafted, Kelleher was able to sign with any team and accepted an offer from the Milwaukee Admirals at the end of the 2017 season. Kelleher showed a great deal of promise the following training camp and got off to a hot start but a knee injury derailed his first full season as a pro. After returning to the ice, he was traded to the Texas Stars for future considerations.

After a disappointing year, Kelleher travelled to Germany to continue his playing career and found much more success with ERC Ingolstadt. After helping the club reach the DEL semifinals in 2019, he spent two seasons with IK Oskarshamn, playing through the uncertainty brought about by COVID-19. In 2021 he debuted for Rögle BK and began his third season in the SHL. Kelleher also played for HV71 in the HockeyAllsvenskan during the 2021-2022 season. Kelleher was transferred to Finnish Elite League team Tappara for the 2022-2023 season, where he scored his first goal in Finland during preseason match against HPK.

Career statistics

Regular season and playoffs

International

Awards and honors

References

External links

1995 births
Living people
American men's ice hockey forwards
Ice hockey people from Massachusetts
People from Longmeadow, Massachusetts
AHCA Division I men's ice hockey All-Americans
HV71 players
ERC Ingolstadt players
Lahti Pelicans players
New Hampshire Wildcats men's ice hockey players
Milwaukee Admirals players
IK Oskarshamn players
Rögle BK players
Tappara players
Texas Stars players